The Sikorsky S-68 was a proposed modification of the S-58T turboshaft powered helicopter by moving its engines from the nose to above the cabin similar to the S-61. Doubt about the market potential of the design led to termination of the project before any examples were produced.

References

Sikorsky aircraft
1960s United States helicopters